John Sharman may refer to:

 John Fowler (British Army officer) (John Sharman Fowler, 1864–1939), Commander British Forces in China
 John Edward Sharman (1892–1917), Canadian flying ace in World War I
 John Sharman, 1941 head of the charitable organisation Grand Order of Water Rats